Den stora dagen is a 2006 studio album by Mats Bergmans. It peaked at number eight on the Swedish Albums Chart and consists of both newly written and older songs.

The album earned a gold certification with 30,000 copies sold, just before the limit for a gold record was reduced to 20,000 and the album was awarded under the older rules.

Despite the album's success, Sveriges Radio didn't want to play the music until booker Hermansson threatened with going to the European Court of Human Rights.

Track listing
Jag vill andas samma luft som du (covering Pierre Isacsson)
Kan du hålla dom orden
Den stora dagen (covering Vikingarna)
Tack och hej
Ain't that a Shame
Jag har inte tid (covering Sten & Stanley)
Leker med elden
Lilla fågel
Finders, Keepers, Loosers, Weepers
Är du min älskling än? (covering Janne Önnerud)
Det borde vara jag
När jag vaknar
Let Me Be There (covering John Rostill)
Ge mig tid

Charts

Weekly charts

Year-end charts

References 

2006 albums
Mats Bergmans albums